The 2018–19 season  was the 47th edition of the National Basketball League of England. Solent Kestrels won their 1st league title.

Division 1

Teams

Team changes
 Loughborough University to Loughborough Riders
 Kent Crusaders to Barking Abbey Crusaders

Promoted from Division 2
 Thames Valley Cavaliers
 Nottingham Hoods
 Essex Leopards

Folded
 Northumbria University
 Lancashire Spinners

Regular season

Playoffs
Quarter-finals

Semi-finals

Final

Division 2

Teams

Team changes
 Middlesex LTBC to London United

Promoted from Division 3
 Myerscough College
 East London All-Stars

Relegated from Division 2
 Birmingham Elite

Regular season

Playoffs
Quarter-finals

Semi-finals

Final

Division 3

Regular season

North Division

South Division

Playoffs
Final

Division 4

Regular season

North

Midlands

South East

South West

Playoffs
Final

References

English Basketball League seasons
English
English
Basketball
Basketball